Ockbrook School was an independent coeducational day and boarding school for children aged 3–18 years situated in rural Derbyshire between the cities of Nottingham and Derby. Boarding was for boys and girls from age 11–18 years. On Monday 7 June 2021 the school announced it was closing at the end of the summer term.

Ockbrook was founded by the Moravian Church and its Christian heritage is evidenced by its school emblem, which features the Agnus Dei, and the school motto, which is also the motto of the Church.

History

Ockbrook was founded in 1799 by the Moravian Church and still maintains a Christian ethos. The school was originally a ladies' school and the boys' school did not open until 1813. It became a girls-only school in 1915. The primary section later became coeducational, although this is now being extended throughout the school.

The Church is still responsible for the school but responsibility is now exercised largely through the school's local board of governors.

A history of the school was published in 2000 as part of the bicentenary celebrations (1799–1999).

In March 2012 the board of governors announced the decision to extend the 11+ intake to boys beginning in September 2013 as a step towards coeducation. The school was fully coeducational from September 2016

Buildings
The main building in the school, referred to as "main school" is used for most lessons and houses the English, Maths, Humanities and Languages departments, along with other smaller classrooms for 6th form use. The main school also provides form rooms for years 7–13.

The Grange is a primary building located near to the main school, next to the Birtill Hall (named after a previous Head Teacher.) The Mount is a further primary building, housing nursery and years 1, and 2. Pupils move over to The Grange for years 3, 4, 5 and 6.

The school also has a Sports Complex, Arts and Technology complex (named Mallalieu Centre), Music block, Lecture Theatre and Science complex (opened in 2003).

The school also operated 3 boarding houses: Mews, Liley House and Broadstairs located on the campus.

Closure 
On 7 June 2021, the school announced to staff, students and parents that the school would close at the end of the summer term. On 8 June the school announced that it remained "significantly loss-making", a situation made worse by the COVID-19 pandemic

Notable alumni
Alex Hamilton – BBC Presenter and weather presenter

Kate Oates – British television producer, known for her work on the soap operas The Archers, Emmerdale, and Coronation Street.

Squash Falconer – Adventurer, Mountaineer, Motivational Speaker and presenter

Former pupils are entitled membership of the Ockbrook School Leavers' Association (OSLA).

Notes and references

External links
 Ockbrook School
 Ockbrook School at WikiMapia
 Profile on the ISC website
 ISI Inspection Reports

Girls' schools in Derbyshire
Defunct schools in Derbyshire
Boarding schools in Derbyshire
Educational institutions established in 1799
Educational institutions of the British Province of the Moravian Church
1799 establishments in England
Educational institutions disestablished in 2021
2021 disestablishments in England